Eugène Prévost is the name of:

Eugène Prévost (cyclist) (1863–1961), French cyclist
Eugène Prévost (carpenter) (1898–1965), French Canadian carpenter
Eugène Prévost (musician) (1809–1872), French composer